Charles Mozin (Paris, March 12, 1806 - Trouville-sur-Mer, November 7, 1862) was a French painter, draftsman and lithographer.

Biography 
Born into a family of musicians, his brother, Théodore Mozin, was second grand prix de Rome in musical composition in 1841, was a composer and professor at the Conservatoire Musical de Paris; his father, composer Benoit Mozin, was also a professor there and introduced his son Charles. But his true passion was painting. Charles Mozin entered the workshop of Xavier Leprince where he participated in the Embarquement des bestiaux à Honfleur. He discovered Trouville-sur-Mer in 1825.

In 1828, by introducing his friend Henri Rittner, a print dealer to Adolphe Goupil, he gave rise to the house Rittner & Goupil.

He married Pauline Coïc, daughter of Julien Désiré Abel Coïc, on May 11, 1829 and had two daughters. He settled in Trouville in 1839, building his house on a plot of land purchased in the Place de la Cahotte, a building that still exists.

Mozin was elected to the Trouville City Council in 1843 and participated in the development of the city.

He also built later the tour Malakoff, meeting point for lovers of the Roches Noires. Discoverer of Trouville, according to Yves Bayard, Charles Mozin sold his first painting to the Duchess of Berry.

He died in 1862 and his body was buried in the Montmartre cemetery in Paris. The sale of the atelier took place in 1865 at the Hotel Drouot and consisted of two hundred and seven paintings, drawings, watercolors and models of boats that served as models.

Musician and composer Charles Malherbe (1853-1911) was his grandson and painter Fernand Piet (1869-1842) his great-grandson.

Engraver Frederic Martens was the author of large aquatints taken from his paintings.

Gallery

Public Collections 

 Castello di Versailles
 Musée de Trouville - Villa Montebello, Trouville-sur-Mer (19 quadri)
 Museo Eugène-Boudin de Honfleur
 Museo marittimo dell'isola Tatihou, Saint-Vaast-la-Hougue
 Musée Carnavalet, Paris
 Musée des Augustins, Tolosa
 Museo d'arte di Tolone
 Museum of modern art André Malraux - MuMa, Le Havre
 Musée des beaux-arts de Rouen
 Castello di Dieppe.
 Museo di Piccardia, Amiens
 Museo di storia della città e della zona di Saint-Malo
 Château de Nemours
 Rijksmuseum, Amsterdam
 Museo Ridder Smidt van Gelder, Antwerp
 Museo di Paisley e Gallerie d'Arte, Paisley, Scotland

Expositions 

 1963: Ville de Trouville Charles Mozin, Paul Huet et les peintres découvreurs de Trouville
 1988: Musée de Trouville-Villa Montebello (from 28 May to 1 August)
 1988: Musée Eugène Boudin de Honfleur (from 6 August to 3 October)
 2018: Musée de Trouville-Villa Montebello (from 23 June to 11 November)

Bibliography 

 
 
 
 
 
 François-Edmond Pâris, Essai sur la construction navale des peuples extra-européens. 2 volumes, texte et atlas de 133 planches OCLC 03211984, su 76 litografie, 57 sono di Charles Mozin.

References

Sister projects 

1862 deaths
1806 births
French lithographers
French draughtsmen
19th-century French painters